Bahmai-ye Garmsiri District (meaning "Tropical Bahmai") is a district (bakhsh) in Bahmai County, Kohgiluyeh and Boyer-Ahmad Province, Iran. At the 2006 census, its population was 12,874, in 2,498 families.  The District has no cities. The District has two rural districts (dehestan): Bahmai-ye Garmsiri-ye Shomali Rural District and Sar Asiab-e Yusefi Rural District.

References 

Districts of Kohgiluyeh and Boyer-Ahmad Province
Bahmai County